Government Polytechnic Solapur is a state-run college in Solapur, Maharashtra, India, which offers diplomas in engineering and technology.

Course Details

AICTE Approved Post S.S.C. Diploma in Engineering (Polytechnics) Affiliated to Maharashtra State Board of Technical Education, Mumbai

History
The institute was established in 1956. It is governed by Directorate of Technical Education, Mumbai. All the courses run are affiliated to Maharashtra State Board For Technical Education, Mumbai (Pune Region). The institute was honoured with  ISTE Narsee Monjee Award for best overall performance during the year 2001. The institute  was adjudged Best Polytechnic in the state of Maharashtra by the Government of Maharashtra for year 2001–2002.

Alumni Network

GPS Alumni Association was formed on 13 March 2016.

External links
Official website

Universities and colleges in Maharashtra
Education in Solapur
Educational institutions established in 1956
1956 establishments in Bombay State

http://gpsolapur.ac.in/   Official website of GP Solapur